Wei Ning (born August 5, 1982 in Laizhou, Yantai, Shandong) is a female Chinese sports shooter. She competed in the 2004 Summer Olympics where she won the silver medal in the women's skeet competition. In the 2008 Olympics in Beijing she reached the final of the six best but could not win a medal.  At the 2012 Summer Olympics, she again won the silver medal in the women's skeet.

Wei Ning is one of the outstanding Skeet shots in the World. She won the World Championships in 2003 and won the silver medal in 2007 and 2010. She won the World Cup Final three times in 2001, 2002 and 2004. Wei won six World Cups and finished on the podium eight more times, most recently at the World Cup in Concepcion Chile in March 2011.

Having won in 2010 in Guangzhou, Wei Ning is the currently reigning Asian Games champion. She already won the silver medal at the Asian Games in 2006.

It is her trademark that she usually wears white golf gloves in competitions.

See also 
 China at the 2012 Summer Olympics

References

External links
 
 
 

1982 births
Living people
Olympic shooters of China
Olympic silver medalists for China
Sportspeople from Yantai
Shooters at the 2004 Summer Olympics
Shooters at the 2008 Summer Olympics
Shooters at the 2012 Summer Olympics
Shooters at the 2016 Summer Olympics
Skeet shooters
World record holders in shooting
Asian Games medalists in shooting
Olympic medalists in shooting
Sport shooters from Shandong
Medalists at the 2012 Summer Olympics
Medalists at the 2004 Summer Olympics
Shooters at the 2002 Asian Games
Shooters at the 2006 Asian Games
Shooters at the 2010 Asian Games
Chinese female sport shooters
Asian Games gold medalists for China
Asian Games silver medalists for China
Medalists at the 2002 Asian Games
Medalists at the 2006 Asian Games
Medalists at the 2010 Asian Games